Three Cheers for the Paraclete (1968) is a novel by the Australian author Thomas Keneally. It won the Miles Franklin Award in 1968.

Story outline
After studying overseas for some years a young priest, James Maitland, returns to Australia to teach at a seminary.

Critical reception
In The Canberra Times, John N. Molony is impressed with the book but finds a number of problems with it: "The heart of the novel is about belief, but for this reviewer the transplant didn't work. It is hard to say about a Keneally that his theme was too big for him and that he couldn't incarnate his problem in living characters. Yet in this instance they do not measure up."

Kirkus Reviews found something more in the book: 'Keneally's rather existential points are made with delicacy, at times with a warm, broad humor, and Father James is a vigorous, attractive priest. A thoughtful and sentient book."

Awards and nominations
 Miles Franklin Literary Award, 1968: winner
 C. Weichhardt Award for Australian Literature, 1969: winner

References

 Middlemiss.org

1968 Australian novels
Miles Franklin Award-winning works
Novels by Thomas Keneally
Angus & Robertson books